Bilel Aloui (born 29 August 1990) is a visually impaired Tunisian Paralympic athlete. He represented Tunisia at the 2016 Summer Paralympics held in Rio de Janeiro, Brazil and he won the bronze medal in the men's 5000 metres T13 event. He also competed in the men's 1500 metres T13 event where he finished in 6th place.

At the 2017 World Para Athletics Championships held in London, United Kingdom, he won the silver medal in the men's 5000 metres T13 event.

References

External links 
 

Living people
1990 births
Place of birth missing (living people)
Athletes (track and field) at the 2016 Summer Paralympics
Medalists at the 2016 Summer Paralympics
Paralympic bronze medalists for Tunisia
Paralympic medalists in athletics (track and field)
Paralympic athletes of Tunisia
Tunisian male long-distance runners
21st-century Tunisian people